Harry Dick (November 22, 1922 – December 1, 2002) was a Canadian professional ice hockey player who played 12 games in the National Hockey League with the Chicago Black Hawks during the 1946–47 season. The rest of his career, which lasted from 1939 to 1955, was spent in various minor leagues. Dick was born in Port Colborne, Ontario.

Career statistics

Regular season and playoffs

External links
 
Obituary at LostHockey.com

1922 births
2002 deaths
Atlantic City Sea Gulls (EHL) players
Buffalo Bisons (AHL) players
Canadian expatriates in the United States
Canadian ice hockey defencemen
Chicago Blackhawks players
Cleveland Barons (1937–1973) players
Hershey Bears players
Ice hockey people from Ontario
Kansas City Pla-Mors players
Louisville Blades players
Minneapolis Millers (AHA) players
Ontario Hockey Association Senior A League (1890–1979) players
People from Port Colborne
Philadelphia Rockets players
Tulsa Oilers (USHL) players
Vancouver Canucks (WHL) players
Washington Lions players